Prostanthera nudula, commonly known as Mount Illbillee mintbush, is a species of flowering plant in the family Lamiaceae and is endemic to South Australia. It is a shrub with branches that become spiny, narrow elliptic leaves and pale cream-coloured flowers with yellow dots inside.

Description
Flowering occurs from September to October.

Taxonomy
Prostanthera nudula was first formally described in 1957 by Enid Lucy Robertson from an unpublished description by John McConnell Black. The description was published in the second edition of the Flora of South Australia from specimens collected by J.B. Cleland in the Everard Ranges in 1950.

Distribution and habitat
Mount Illbillee mintbush grows amongst granite outcrops, usually near watercourse. It is relatively common in the Everard Ranges and is also found in the Musgrave Ranges.

References

nudula
Flora of South Australia
Lamiales of Australia
Plants described in 1957